William James Jameson (August 8, 1898 – October 8, 1990) was a United States district judge of the United States District Court for the District of Montana.

Education and career

Born in Butte, Montana, Jameson received an Artium Baccalaureus degree from the University of Montana in 1919 and a Bachelor of Laws from the Alexander Blewett III School of Law at the University of Montana in 1922. He was in private practice in Billings, Montana from 1922 to 1957, and was a member of the Montana House of Representatives from 1927 to 1930.

Federal judicial service

On March 5, 1957, Jameson was nominated by President Dwight D. Eisenhower to a seat on the United States District Court for the District of Montana vacated by Judge Charles Nelson Pray. Jameson was confirmed by the United States Senate on March 26, 1957, and received his commission on March 28, 1957. He served as Chief Judge from 1965 to 1968. He assumed senior status on February 27, 1969. He was a Judge of the Temporary Emergency Court of Appeals from 1976 to 1987. He remained in senior status until his death on October 8, 1990.

Honors

In 1973, Jameson received the highest honor given by the American Bar Association, the ABA Medal. In 1970, he received the Gonzaga Law Medal, the highest honor given by the Gonzaga University School of Law. The William J. Jameson Law Library at the University of Montana School of Law is named after Jameson. The State Bar of Montana's highest honor is also named after Jameson. The William J. Jameson Award has been given annually since 1989 to a Montana attorney who, among other criteria, "Shows ethical and personal conduct, commitment and activities that exemplify the essence of professionalism".

References

Sources
 

1898 births
1990 deaths
Judges of the United States District Court for the District of Montana
United States district court judges appointed by Dwight D. Eisenhower
20th-century American judges
Presidents of the American Bar Association
Members of the Montana House of Representatives